is a Japanese manga artist.

Life 

Okazaki started drawing in high school and submitted her illustrations to different magazines. For her, this was both a training for art school, which she wanted to apply for, and a way to make money from the prize money. She had saved more than 1 million yen when graduating from high school. The magazine Fanroad by the publisher Rapport published her first manga. She enrolled in and graduated from Tama Art University with a major in design. After university, she worked for the advertising company Hakuhodo, doing conceptual and design work.

Her career as a manga artist became more successful in 1994, when she won a newcomers' award of Bouquet magazine, published the short story "Bathroom Gūwa" and started becoming a regular contributor for the magazine afterwards. Okazaki herself considers this to be her proper debut as a professional manga artist. She was a regular contributor for Cookie from its first issue, the successor to Bouquet. She continued working in advertising until 2001, when she decided to completely focus on her career as a manga artist. Her first longer series was Suppli, which she published from 2003 to 2009 in the josei magazine Feel Young and which is set in an advertising company. While working on Suppli, she gave birth to three children.

Okazaki worked occasionally for seinen magazines already in the early 2000s. From 2014 to 2021, her first longer series for a seinen magazine was published in Monthly Big Comic Spirits, the historical manga A-un. The series is her most critically acclaimed work so far. It was commended by manga authors Ryoko Yamagishi, Yuki Suetsugu and Masami Yuki and writers Rio Shimamoto and Kazuki Kaneshiro. A-un was one of the Jury Recommended Works at the 23rd Japan Media Arts Festival in 2020.

Several of her manga, among them Kanojo ga Shinjatta and Shibuya ku Maruyama cho, have been adapted as live-action films or TV series. Her work has been translated into English, French and Polish.

Works

References 

1967 births
Japanese female comics artists
Female comics writers
Women manga artists
Living people
Manga artists from Nagano Prefecture
Japanese women writers